Leave It to Me is a 1930 British comedy film directed by George King and starring Robin Irvine, Dorothy Seacombe and A. Bromley Davenport. It was made at Twickenham Studios as a quota quickie for Fox Film.

Cast
 Robin Irvine as Larry  
 Dorothy Seacombe as Mrs. Jordan  
 A. Bromley Davenport as Mr. Jordan  
 Harold Huth as Slade  
 Joan Wyndham as Ann Jordan  
 Frank Stanmore as Merton  
 Tom Helmore as Tony  
 Fanny Wright as Housekeeper

References

Bibliography
 Low, Rachael. Filmmaking in 1930s Britain. George Allen & Unwin, 1985.
 Wood, Linda. British Films, 1927-1939. British Film Institute, 1986.

External links

1930 films
British comedy films
1930 comedy films
Films shot at Twickenham Film Studios
Films directed by George King
Quota quickies
British black-and-white films
Fox Film films
1930s English-language films
1930s American films
1930s British films